The Cape Town International Challenge is an invitational association football tournament to be hosted in Cape Town, South Africa. The tournament has no official name and has also been referred to as Cape Town International Under-20 Challenge, Eight Nations Cup  and the 8 Nation under 20 International Football Challenge. The draw was made on 16 May 2012. The tournament is open to players under 20 years of age. It is considered to be a successor to the 2010 Cape Town International Challenge.

The competition was organised by the Cape Town division of the South African Football Association.

Japan will be represented by their u-19 team.

Squads

South Africa

Head coach:  Solly Luvhengo

Argentina
Head coach:  Marcelo Trobbiani

Ghana
Head coach:  Orlando Wellington

Nigeria
Head coach:  Sam Obuh

Group B

Brazil

Cameroon
Head coach:

Kenya

Head coach:  Stanley Okumbi

Japan

Head coach:  Yasushi Yoshida

Group stage

Group A

Group B

Knockout stage

Semi finals

Third place playoff

Final

Awards 

Top goal scorer –   Thabani Mthembu (5 goals)
Top goalkeeper -  Andres Mehring
Player of the tournament –  Misael Bueno

Group B

Brazil

Cameroon
Head coach:

Kenya

Head coach:  Stanley Okumbi

Japan

Head coach:  Yasushi Yoshida

References

2012
2011–12 in South African soccer
2011–12 in Argentine football
2011–12 in Ghanaian football
2011–12 in Nigerian football
2012 in Brazilian football
2012 in Japanese football
2012 in Cameroonian football
2012 in Kenyan football